Delchevo (Cyrillic:  Делчево) is a common name for a settlement in the central Balkan peninsula. It is typically named after Gotse Delchev. The places could refer to any of the following:

Delčevo, a town in eastern North Macedonia, along the border with Bulgaria.
Delchevo, Blagoevgrad Province, a settlement in Bulgaria.
Delchevo, Razgrad Province, a settlement in Bulgaria.

See also 
Gotse Delchev (town), a town in south-western Bulgaria.